The White-Luck Warrior is the second book in the Aspect-Emperor series by R. Scott Bakker. It was published in April 2011.

Events take place directly after The Judging Eye and around 20 years after the conclusion of the Prince of Nothing trilogy. Drusas Achamian, the former Mandate Schoolman, continues his quest to determine Kellhus' origins and travels across the black forest of the Mop with a band of mercenaries and the step-daughter of Anasûrimbor Kellhus, Mimara. To the North, Kellhus' Great Ordeal pushes closer to Golgotterath.

References

Canadian fantasy novels
2011 Canadian novels
The Overlook Press books
Orbit Books books